Melisa Kerman (born February 7, 1994 in İzmir, Turkey) is a Turkish female volleyball player. In July 2012, she returned to her first club Karşıyaka, which competes in the Turkish Women's Volleyball Second League. Kerman is a member of the Turkey women's youth national volleyball team, and wears number 12.

Born to a volletballer mother in Izmir, she began with volleyball at the age of eleven in the Karşıyaka. Three years later, she managed to play in the A-team of her club. Due to her tallness, Melisa was admitted also to the basketball team, where she played two years long during her secondary school.

Clubs
  Karşıyaka İzmir (2005-2009)
  TVF Sport High School (2009-2011)
  VakıfBank Türk Telekom (2011-2012)
  Karşıyaka (2012-2013)

Awards

National team
2011 FIVB Girls Youth World Championship -

See also
 Turkish women in sports

References

1994 births
Sportspeople from İzmir
Living people
Turkish women's volleyball players
VakıfBank S.K. volleyballers
21st-century Turkish women